Anne Ottenbrite (born May 12, 1966) is a Canadian former breaststroke swimmer, who won three medals at the 1984 Summer Olympics in Los Angeles: gold (200-metre breaststroke), silver (100-metre breaststroke), and bronze (4×100-metre medley relay). In the last event she was accompanied by Reema Abdo, Michelle MacPherson and Pamela Rai.

Ottenbrite attended the University of Southern California, and swam or the USC Trojans swimming and diving team.

See also
 List of members of the International Swimming Hall of Fame
 List of Olympic medalists in swimming (women)

References

External links
 
 
 
 
 
 
 

1966 births
Living people
Olympic swimmers of Canada
Swimmers at the 1982 Commonwealth Games
Swimmers at the 1983 Pan American Games
Swimmers at the 1984 Summer Olympics
Swimmers from Ontario
Olympic gold medalists for Canada
Olympic silver medalists for Canada
Olympic bronze medalists for Canada
USC Trojans women's swimmers
Commonwealth Games gold medallists for Canada
Commonwealth Games silver medallists for Canada
Sportspeople from Clarington
Olympic bronze medalists in swimming
World Aquatics Championships medalists in swimming
Canadian female breaststroke swimmers
Pan American Games gold medalists for Canada
Pan American Games silver medalists for Canada
Medalists at the 1984 Summer Olympics
Olympic gold medalists in swimming
Olympic silver medalists in swimming
Commonwealth Games medallists in swimming
Pan American Games medalists in swimming
Medalists at the 1983 Pan American Games
20th-century Canadian women
21st-century Canadian women
Medallists at the 1982 Commonwealth Games